The 2000 World Grand Prix was the third staging of the World Grand Prix darts tournament, organised by the Professional Darts Corporation. It was the first World Grand Prix to take place in Ireland, being held at the Crosbie Cedars Hotel in Rosslare, County Wexford, between 25–29 October 2000.

Phil Taylor maintained his unbeaten record in the tournament, defeating Shayne Burgess 6–1 in the final.

Prize money

Seeds

Results

References

World Grand Prix (darts)
World Grand Prix Darts